Delve is a municipality belonging to the Amt Kirchspielslandgemeinde ("collective municipality") Eider in the district Dithmarschen in Schleswig-Holstein, in northern Germany.

Of a total population of 734, 364 are male, 374 are female (Dec 31, 2004).

References

External links
 www.delve.de

Dithmarschen